"Gluten Free Ebola" is the second episode in the eighteenth season of the American animated television series South Park. The 249th overall episode, it was written and directed by series co-creator Trey Parker. The episode premiered on Comedy Central in the United States on October 1, 2014. The episode lampoons the trend of the gluten-free diet lifestyle and the constant changes recommended to the Western pattern diet and the current food guide.

Plot
Following the events of "Go Fund Yourself", Stan, Cartman, Kyle, and Kenny return to school, only to find themselves ostracized and ridiculed for their recent actions. Meanwhile, at a meeting, Mr. Mackey gloats about his newfound gluten-free diet, greatly annoying other staff.

In order to gain back their popularity, Cartman decides to throw a party for a "cause", choosing Scott Malkinson's diabetes. They announce the party over the local radio station WSPIC, with Principal Victoria, who had earlier been converted into gluten-free by Mr. Mackey, asking whether it has gluten-free foods, for which the boys have no response.

Later at the community center, a scientist from the United States Department of Agriculture tries to explain that the rumors about gluten being bad are false by extracting gluten from a piece of dough made of wheat. Mr. Mackey pressures him to drink the gluten sample in order to back the scientist's claims; he complies, and abruptly starts to violently die, sending the entire town into anarchy. Cartman, who's in a panicked state, calls Kyle and tells him that the whole town has taken all the food with gluten and the party cannot happen. The USDA tries to find a way to end the crisis.

At the Marsh residence, two USDA agents enter and find a can of beer in the garbage, which Randy sees no problem with. Unknown to him, beer contains wheat, which ends up getting him quarantined at a Papa John's restaurant with Mr. Garrison and an unnamed civilian.

Cartman then has a dream of Aunt Jemima (a parody reference to Mother Abigail), who tells him the food pyramids are upside-down, but Cartman has no idea what she is talking about. As the gluten-free toppings at the Papa John's run out, the unnamed resident eats the pizza dough containing gluten, thinking it's all a setup, but he dies shortly afterwards.

At the radio station, Stan, Kyle, and Kenny announced that they have canceled the party to focus their efforts on addressing the public about the dangers of gluten. Cartman, claiming that he knows how to solve the crisis, calls the USDA and tells them that the food pyramid is upside down. Much to their surprise, the new dietary system works. The boys then throw a successful party with Stan reconciling with Wendy, leading her to ask him to dance with her as the credits appended "GF" (gluten-free) to a handful of the cast and crew.

Production
The idea for the episode came from Trey Parker and Matt Stone noticing how people they work with, and society in general, were going on gluten-free diets. It became so common that they went on diets themselves and thought it would be fun to do an episode mocking themselves.

Reception
The episode received a C from The A.V. Clubs Josh Mordell. Mordell found the gluten-free panic "reasonably funny", but felt the episode lacked a B-story.

Similarly, IGN's contributor Max Nicholson gave the episode a 7 out of 10, praising the panic caused by gluten products, but was also disappointed with the storyline following the boys' party, noting that "the radio show segments were among the least funny South Park moments in recent memory".

Spin magazine's Brennan Carley criticized the Lorde parody, asking: "has Lorde ever really done anything all that worthy of drawing the cartoon creators' ire?" South Park responded by a subplot in the following week's episode "The Cissy", featuring a Spin reporter named "Brandon Carlile" investigating the concert and stating: "It would be a shame if someone was…having fun at her expense."

References

External links
 "Gluten Free Ebola" Full episode at South Park Studios
 

Cross-dressing in television
Gluten-free diet
South Park (season 18) episodes